Sundamys is a genus of rodent in the family Muridae, found mostly in Indonesia and Malaysia.
It contains the following species:
 Annandale's rat (Sundamys annandalei)
 Mountain giant Sunda rat (Sundamys infraluteus)
 Bartels's rat (Sundamys maxi)
 Müller's giant Sunda rat (Sundamys muelleri)

References

 
Rodent genera
Taxa named by Guy Musser
Taxonomy articles created by Polbot